Adiós Argentina (English language: Goodbye Argentina) is a 1930 Argentine musical film directed and written by Mario Parpagnoli. The film starred Ada Cornaro and Pierina Dealessi. Libertad Lamarque also made an appearance at the age of 22 as the Bride of the Homeless.

Although a silent film, Adiós Argentina was the first Argentine film to ever feature a soundtrack. The film is a musical featuring tango dancing, an integral part of Argentine culture.

Cast
 Ada Cornaro
 M. D'Acuña
 Pierina Dealessi
 Ana Fábregas
 Libertad Lamarque as the Bride of Homeless
 Mario Parpagnoli
 A. Risetto
 Silvio Romano
 Lya Sack
 Carmen Valdés

References

External links
 

Argentine silent films
1930 films
Spanish musical films
1930s Spanish-language films
Tango films
Argentine black-and-white films
1930 musical films
Canadian musical films
Argentine musical films
Spanish-language Canadian films
1930s Canadian films
1930s Argentine films